Persatuan Sepakbola Indonesia Banjarnegara (simply known as Persibara) is an Indonesian football club based in Banjarnegara Regency, Central Java. They compete in the Liga 3, but they currently compete in the Soeratin Cup for the youth team because in their senior team sector, they have been out for almost 3 seasons (2021, 2020, and 2019) in the Liga 3.

Honours
 Liga 3 Central Java
 Runner-up: 2018

References

External links

Football clubs in Indonesia
Football clubs in Central Java
Association football clubs established in 1989
1989 establishments in Indonesia